The Internet Takeover is a British radio show hosted on BBC Radio 1 on Monday nights, presented by various members of the online video blogging community. It was the successor to the Dan and Phil show hosted by Daniel Howell and Phil Lester (Dan and Phil), both of whom had a monthly slot on the programme. It came to an end in April 2016 and was replaced with The Student Radio Playlist.

Presenters 
Internet sensations Howell and Lester, the main hosts of the show, presented a live version of the programme on the first Monday of every month. Every other Monday, a rotation of other presenters from the video blogging community hosted the show, although these shows are recorded in advance of the air date. Such presenters have included:

Internet Takeover Special 
In February 2015, Howell hosted a #NicerInternet special of the radio show, titled Anti-Social Media Live. They were joined by other internet takeover presenters including Phil Lester, Jack Howard, Dean Dobbs, Jim Chapman, Patricia Bright, Tom Ridgewell, Louise Pentland and Charlie McDonnell. The panel discussed online bullying, shared stories of their own negative experiences and explored ways in which the internet could be made a nicer place.

References

External links 
BBC Radio 1 - The Internet Takeover on BBC iPlayer

BBC Radio 1 programmes
Dan and Phil
2014 radio programme debuts
2016 radio programme endings